Zach Gallagher (born 4 September 2001) is a New Zealand rugby union player who plays for Canterbury and the . His playing position is lock. He was the 2019 Head Prefect at Christ's College.

Reference list

External links
 

2001 births
New Zealand rugby union players
Living people
Rugby union locks
Canterbury rugby union players
Crusaders (rugby union) players